John Forzani (April 5, 1947 – October 30, 2014) was a Canadian businessman, former Canadian Football League (CFL) player, and CFL team owner. He was the Chairman and co-founder of FGL Sports.

Early life
Born in Calgary, Alberta, he received a degree in business administration from Utah State University in 1971. In 1971, he joined the Calgary Stampeders as an offensive lineman and was part of the winning team of the 59th Grey Cup. He played football until 1976.

Career
In 1974, he opened a  store called Forzani's Locker Room in Calgary. In 1994, he acquired Sports Experts Inc. for $20 million becoming Canada's largest sporting goods retailer.

In 2001, the Retail Council of Canada recognized Forzani's work in leading FGL Sports (then known as the Forzani Group) to outstanding business success. In recognition of this accomplishment he was presented with the Distinguished Canadian Retailer of the Year Award.

In 2005, he became a part owner of the Calgary Stampeders.
In June 2005, Concordia University conferred an honorary doctorate at the convocation ceremony for the John Molson School of Business, and he gave the address to the graduates.

Personal
John and two of his brothers, Joe and Tom, all played together with the Calgary Stampeders. Joe and Tom also attended Utah State University. Forzani died of a heart attack on October 30, 2014.

References

External links
CFLapedia bio

1947 births
2014 deaths
Businesspeople from Calgary
Calgary Stampeders players
Canadian football offensive linemen
Canadian people of Italian descent
Players of Canadian football from Alberta
Canadian football people from Calgary
Utah State Aggies football players